Sultan Êzîd (or sometimes Êzî or Siltan Êzîd) is a divine figure in the Yazidi religion. Although many scholars consider his name to be derived from that of the second Umayyad caliph Yazid I, many Yazidis consider him to be a separate figure unconnected to the historical Yazid I. Yazidis typically consider him to be part of a triad of divine emanations of God (which are, in order, Melek Tawus, Sheikh Adi, and Sultan Ezid), though he is sometimes also considered to be identical with the angel Melek Tawus, and thus a manifestation or emanation of God.

The Yazidi people and religion are named after him.

Origin
Most modern historians hold that the name Ezid derives from the name of Caliph Yazid I. In Yazidi religious lore, there is no trace of any link between Sultan Ezid and the second Umayyad caliph. A pro-Umayyad movement particularly sympathetic towards Yazid existed in the Kurdish mountains before the 12th century, when Shaykh Adi, a Sufi of Umayyad descent venerated by Yazidis to this day, settled there and attracted a following among the adherents of the movement. The name Yazidi seems to have been applied to the group because of his Umayyad origins.

Shrines
Yazidis also consider Melek Tawus's shrine at Lalish to be identical with that of Sultan Ezid's, since the two figures are often held to be identical.

Holidays
The Feast of Ezid commemorates him.

References

Sources

Yazidi mythology